Matthew C. Keller is an American behavioral and psychiatric geneticist. He is the Director of the Institute for Behavioral Genetics and a professor in the Department of Psychology and Neuroscience at the University of Colorado Boulder. He is known for his criticism of the candidate gene approach  and for development of approaches in quantitative genetics.

References

External links

Faculty page

Living people
Psychiatric geneticists
American geneticists
University of Colorado Boulder faculty
University of Texas at Austin alumni
University of Michigan alumni
Year of birth missing (living people)